Diemeniana is a genus of cicada in the cicadettini tribe of the Cicadinae subfamily native to Australia. Five species have been described.

References

Hemiptera of Australia
Taxa named by William Lucas Distant
Cicadettini
Cicadidae genera